The Pensions Appeal Tribunal was a judicial tribunal in the United Kingdom which had jurisdiction to hear and decide appeals against decisions of the Secretary of State in connection with applications for war pensions by former members of the military services.

The original Tribunal was abolished in November 2008 and its functions transferred to the First-tier Tribunal War Pensions and Armed Forces Compensation Chamber. All staff and tribunal members were transferred to the new Chamber. Legal chairmen became known as tribunal judges.

2008 disestablishments in the United Kingdom
Former courts and tribunals in the United Kingdom
History of veterans' affairs in the United Kingdom
Pensions in the United Kingdom
Courts and tribunals disestablished in 2008